Acromas Holdings is a holding company formed in May 2007 by Charterhouse Capital Partners, CVC Capital Partners and Permira, to act as the parent company of Automobile Association and Saga, ahead of the companies' mergers in September 2007. 

Acromas listed Saga on the London Stock Exchange through an initial public offering (IPO) in May 2014, followed by The AA in June that year.

References

External links

Companies based in Kent
Holding companies established in 2007
British companies established in 2007
2007 establishments in England
Permira companies
Health care companies of the United Kingdom